Edward Jacob may refer to:
Edward Jacob (antiquary), English antiquary and mayor
Edward Jacob (barrister) (c.1795–1841), English legal writer
Ian Jacob (Edward Ian Jacob), politician and broadcaster

See also

Edward Jacobs (disambiguation)